The LSWR Class T7 4-2-2-0 was a prototype express steam locomotive design by Dugald Drummond for the London and South Western Railway introduced in 1897. Five similar locomotives, classified E10, were introduced in 1901.

Background

Number 720 was a prototype locomotive built in 1897 and classified T7. The layout was unusual and influenced by Francis Webb's 3-cylinder compound locomotives introduced in 1883 on the London and North Western Railway (LNWR) that employed two pairs of uncoupled driving wheels; the Drummond locomotives were always known as the "double singles". Five similar locomotives, numbers 369-373, were built in 1901 and classified E10.

Design features
Throughout locomotive history, this type of layout with independent uncoupled trains of driving wheels mounted on a common rigid chassis has been repeatedly tried with various aims in mind (the best-known more recent example is the Duplex locomotive).

Aims
In the case of Drummond, the main motive appears to have been to obtain maximum grate area in a period where low-pitched boilers were the norm and the firebox had to be set low between the frames. This limited the width of the grate whilst its length depended on the distance between the coupled axles minus the throw of eventual inside cranks; at the same time there was a reluctance to make the coupling rods too long due to concern about material resistance, for a broken coupling rod flailing away under a locomotive could wreak tremendous havoc. One way out of the impasse was to eliminate the coupling rods altogether and to have two independent pairs of driving wheels each pair driven by its own cylinders.

Earlier experiments
The first engineer known to have adopted this solution was Francis Webb, followed by Alfred de Glehn in France who initially combined divided drive and independent driving axles, finally opting solely for the former whilst coupling the driving wheels. The aforementioned engineers locomotives were compounds and the layout was also a way of separating high-pressure from low-pressure drive trains.

Drummond's locomotives
Boiler
Drummond's T7 and E10 worked with simple expansion so that the principle benefit sought would be the increased grate area. Compared with Drummond's standard boilers, the T7's barrel length was increased from 10 feet 6 inches to 12 feet.

Valve gear
Another unusual feature of the T7 and E10 locomotives was the valve gear. The valves for the inside cylinders were operated by Stephenson valve gear and the valves for the outside cylinders were operated by Joy valve gear.

Rebuild

In 1905, number 720 was rebuilt with a larger boiler with the diameter increased from 4 foot 5.5 inches (1.4 m) to 4 foot 10.75 inches (1.5 m). The E10s were not rebuilt.

Construction history
 T7, 1 locomotive built 1897, number 720
 E10, 5 locomotives built 1901, numbers 369-373

References

T07
4-2-2-0 locomotives
Railway locomotives introduced in 1897
Duplex locomotives
Standard gauge steam locomotives of Great Britain